Kabiye (also rendered Kabiyé, Kabiyè, Kabye, Kabyé, Kabyè, Cabrai or Cabrais) is an Eastern Gurunsi Gur language spoken primarily in northern Togo. Throughout the 20th century, there was extensive migration to the centre and south of Togo and also to Ghana and Benin. Kabiye speakers made up over 23% of the Togolese population in 1999.

Status
Kabiye is one of two national languages of Togo (along with Ewe). In the Togolese context, national language currently means that the language is promoted in national media and, in the formal education sector, as an optional exam subject in grades 9 and 10.

Linguistic research
The missionary-linguist Jacques Delord published the first descriptive grammar of Kabiye in 1976. This was followed by Kezié Lébikaza's descriptive grammar in 1999, which remains the key reference work in Kabiye linguistics. There is also a Kabiye-French dictionary. Other topics that have been the focus of research include: Comparative linguistics, Discourse analysis, Language contact, Lexicology,  Morphology, Phonology,  Sociolinguistics, Syntax, Tone orthography, Tonology, and the verb system.

Publications
The earliest known publications in Kabiye appeared in the 1930s. Altogether there have been about 200 publications in Kabiye, though not all of these are still in print or easily available for purchase. For an inventory up to the turn of the century see Pouwili, 1999. Publications include two books of proverbs, folktales, poetry, medical booklets, agricultural booklets, translations of the Bible, political tracts, religious tracts, a short novel, primers, and other pedagogical materials.

Kabiye Wikipedia
The Kabiye Wikipedia was initiated in June 2014 by Gnasse Atinèdi, the secretary of the Académie Kabiye. It currently (July 2017) has 1185 articles on a wide range of international subjects.

Phonology

Consonants

The five voiced consonant sounds  only occur either word-medially or as allophones. 

Vowels

Short vowels

Long vowels

The long back unrounded vowels only occur at morpheme boundaries.

Tones
Kabiye is a tonal language, meaning that pitch differences are used to distinguish one word from another. These contrasts may be lexical (e.g. ɖálʋ́ "elder brother" ~ ɖálʋ̀ "intestinal worm") or grammatical (e.g. ɛɛkɔŋ́ "he isn't coming" ~ ɛɛ́kɔŋ "(when) he comes" ~ ɛ́ɛkɔ́ŋ "if he doesn't come).

There are two tones, high (H) and low (L). Six tone contours are possible on mono- and disyllabic nouns (H, L, HL, LH, HLH, LHL) and three on the imperative form of the verb (H, L, HL).

Kabiye also has automatic downstep, where a H following a L is always pronounced on a lower pitch than the preceding H within the same phonological phrase. Numerous tonal processes occur once words are placed in context.

The contour HLH always surfaces as HꜜHH ~ HHꜜH (depending on the consonant–vowel structure that it associates to). This is a postlexical process that occurs wherever the context permits, within words and across word boundaries.

There is lexical L tone spreading in the verb phrase and the associative noun phrase.

Vowel harmony
Kabiye has vowel harmony, meaning that the quality of the vowel in an affix is determined by that of the root vowel. There are two kinds:

 ATR vowel harmony, in which words contain either the −ATR vowels  (e.g. ɛ-ñɩmɩ́-yɛ "his key") or the +ATR vowels  (e-kalími-yé "his chicken"). The vowel  is unspecified for ATR and can occur in either set.

 Lip rounding vowel harmony, in which some affixes contains either unrounded vowels  or rounded vowels . This process is much more limited, occurring in some TAM suffixes (e.g. è-kpéz-íɣ́ "he coughs" / è-ɖóz-ùù "he dreams") and some adjectival prefixes (e.g. kɩ́-kpɛ̀d-ʋ̀ʋ́ "black", kʋ́-hʋ̀lʋ̀m-ʋ́ʋ̀ "white"). Again, the vowel  is unspecified for ATR and can occur in either set.

A limited number of prefixes undergo both vowel harmony processes, e.g. the first person plural subject pronoun: pà-kpàzá-à "they coughed", pɛ̀-wɛ̀ɛ́tà-à "they whispered", pè-wèlìsàá "they listened", pɔ̀-cɔ́nà-à "they looked", pò-ɖòzà-á "they dreamt".

Orthography
Kabiye was first written in the 1930s, but it was in the early 1980s that the Comité de Langue Nationale Kabiyè (now the Académie Kabiyè), an organ of the Togolese Ministry of Education, standardized the orthography. Kabiye is written in modified Roman script based on the character inventory of the African reference alphabet. An alternative orthography, devised and promoted by R.P. Adjola Raphaël, is widely used among Catholics; it uses the same letters but with different spelling rules. The following tables show the grapheme-phoneme correspondences in the Standard orthography.

Consonants

The orthography contains a significant amount of overspecification, since the 5 voiced obstruent graphemes b, g, gb, v, j are superfluous from a strictly phonemic point of view.

The grapheme  is reserved for loanwords.

Vowels

Short vowels

Long vowels

Tones
The standard orthography of Kabiye does not generally mark tone. The single exception is the spelling of two subject pronouns that are tonal minimal pairs:

Punctuation
The hyphen is used in the standard orthography in order to distinguish homophones. It appear between the possessive pronoun and the noun in the associative noun phrase, and between the verb root and the object pronoun in the verb phrase, e.g.:
{|
|ɛsaŋ     ||     ||he praises
|-
|ɛ-saŋ    ||     ||his showers
|-
|ɛsa-ŋ    ||     ||he scratched you
|}

Grammar
Kabiye is an SVO language. The possessive precedes the head noun. Adjectives, numerals, demonstratives, locatives and relative clauses follow the head noun.

Noun classes
Kabiye has ten noun classes. The first eight are grouped in pairs of singulars and plurals that are sometimes referred to as genders. Some limited cross-pairing occurs. Class 9 contains uncountables (leaves, dust, mosquitos...), while class 10 contains liquids (milk, blood, oil...). There are certain other semantic tendencies (e.g., humans in classes 1 and 2, tools in classes 3 and 4), but these are by no means systematic. The class of any noun is identifiable by its class suffix and by the agreement of other potential elements in the sentence with it, such as pronouns, demonstratives, interrogatives, adjectives, determiners and the numerals one to five. The following table gives an example of a noun–determiner construction from each class. In each case, the class suffix is separated from the root with a hyphen:

Verb conjugations
The verb phrase is composed of an obligatory root and TAM (tense–aspect–mood) suffix. The TAM suffix may indicate imperative (hàzɩ̀ "sweep!"), aorist (ɛ́házɩ̀ "and he swept"), perfective (ɛ̀hàzàá "he swept"), imperfective present (ɛ̀házɩ̀ɣ̀ "he is sweeping"), imperfective past (ɛ̀hàzàɣ́ "he was sweeping") or infinitive (hàzʋ́ʋ̀ "to sweep").

Kabiye is unusual in also having two designated paradigms for expressing comparatives in a subordinate clause: an imperfective form (ɛ̀zɩ́ ɛ̀hàzʋ̀ʋ̀ʋ́ yɔ́ "as he sweeps") and a perfective form (ɛ̀zɩ́ ɛ̀hàzʋ́ʋ̀ yɔ́ "as he swept").

The perfective has two forms: unbound (not followed by a complement: ɛ̀hàzàá "he swept") and bound (followed by a complement: ɛ̀hàzá ɖèdè "he swept yesterday").

The verb phrase may also optionally include modal prefixes that add nuances of meaning: adversative (ɛ̀tɩ́ɩ̀hàzɩ̀ɣ́ "he swept in spite of it"), habitual (ɛ̀tɩ́ɩ́házɩ̀ɣ̀ "he usually sweeps"), expectative (ɛ̀tɩ́ɩ́házɩ́ɣ́ "he sweeps in the meantime"), immediative (ɛ̀tɩ̀hàzàá "he swept straightaway"), pluperfect (ɛ̀ɛ̀hàzàá "he had swept"), future (ɛ̀ɛ́hàzɩ̀ɣ̀ lɛ́ "when he will sweep") and negative (ɛ̀tàhàzɩ́ "he didn't sweep"). Some of these modal prefixes may also appear in combination with each other so that, for example, negative + adversative indicates a negative categorical meaning (ɛ̀tàtɩ́ɩ̀hàzɩ́ "he didn't sweep at all").

The verb phrase may optionally add a subject pronoun prefix (written joined to the root or the modal prefix as in the examples above) and/or an object pronoun suffix (written joined to the root with a hyphen: ɛ̀hàzá-kɛ́ "he swept it").

There is one modal suffix. It is used in conjunction with a negative modal prefix to indicate a Provisional meaning. It is written joined to the verb root (ɛ̀tàhàzɩ̀tá "he has not swept yet").

The verb phrase can also be extended by means of the suffix -náʋ̀ to indicate instrumentality, accompaniment, manner, simultaneity or conformity (ɛ̀hàzɩ́nàà "he swept with").

All verb roots can be nominalised as agentives (házɩ́yʊ́ "sweeper"), adjectives ("kɪ̀hàzʊ̀ʊ́" "swept") or locatives (ɖɩ̀hàzɩ̀yɛ́ "sweeping place").

Sample text
Man-kabɩyɛ kʋnʋŋ, ŋɖewa pɩfɛyɩ naʋ. Yee pɔyɔɔdʋʋ-ŋ nɛ ɛyʋ welesi yɔ, pɩwɛ-ɩ ɛzɩ wondu peteɣ. Ɛlɛ, yee ɛyʋ ɛwɛɛ nɛ ɛɛmaɣzɩɣ ñɔ-yɔɔ camɩyɛ yɔ, ɛɛnaɣ ñe-ɖeu. Nɔɔyʋ ewelesiɣ pɩŋŋ nɛ ɛnɩɩ pɔyɔɔdʋʋ-ŋ yɔ, pɩlakɩ-ɩ ɛzɩ ɛtazɩ nɛ ɛna ñɛ-wɛtʋ yɔ, pɩɩsaŋɩ-ɩ se eyele. Ŋwɛ yuŋ weyi nɛ ɛyʋ ɛɛtɛŋ ñɔ-tɔm yɔ, pɩtɩna nɛ ɛyʋ ɛɖɔkɩ-ŋ pɩfɛyɩ yebu; Ñɛ-wɛtʋ lɩnɩ le nɛ paasɩŋ ñɔ-tɔm ? Tɔm kɔpɔzaɣ ŋga ɖicosuu-kɛ tobi. Ñɛ-wɛtʋ nɛ tɩ-tɩ solo, mbʋ pʋyɔɔ yɔ ɖooo ŋŋwɛɛ, natʋyʋ taasoki ña-taa se tɩpɩsɩ-ŋ nɔɔyʋjaʋ. Kabɩyɛ kʋnʋŋ, ña-pɩɣa canɩɣna-ŋ nɛ kewiliɣ-ŋ, nɛ kasaŋ-ŋ ño-yuŋ, ñe-ɖeu nɛ ñe-leleŋ yɔɔ.

"My Kabiye language, you are so beautiful! When anyone pronounces you and another listens, you are like a song. But anyone who does not ponder you deeply will not perceive your beauty. Anyone who listens attentively when you are being spoken must, as it were, dig deeply to discover your character. It is because of this inexhaustible weightiness that we cannot let go of you. From where does this impenetrable character come? We can reply straight away to this question. Your character is unique, because ever since you came into being, you have never suffered any outside influences which could turn you into something else. Kabiye language, your child is glad for you, cherishes and praises you, because of your strength, your beauty and your sweetness."

References

External links

Documentation, installation files and fonts for typing Kabiye on your computer
Ethnologue entry for Kabiye
"Lamaakaaou: journalisme, Communication pour le développement, Développement personnel"
PanAfriL10n page on Kabiye
"Kabiye Proverbs" Facebook page
"Blog sur la langue et la culture kabiyè"
Association des Femmes pour l'Alphabétisation, la Santé et les Activités génératrices de revenus
Free audio Bible in Kabiye
The New World Translation of the Christian Greek Scriptures, free videos, audio books and other bible study material (Jehovah's Witnesses) 
The Universal Declaration of Human Rights in Kabiyé
Bahaï prayer in Kabiye

Languages of Togo
Languages of Benin
Languages of Ghana
Gurunsi languages